Salvia keerlii is a herbaceous perennial that is native to Mexico. The ovate-lanceolate leaves are grayish, reaching , and aromatic. The lilac flowers grow in whorls on short inflorescences, blooming midsummer to autumn.

Notes

keerlii
Flora of Mexico